Encore for Eleanor is a children's picture book written by Bill Peet. It is about a circus elephant who loves the spotlight even after retirement. It was originally published in 1981 by the Houghton Mifflin Co., Boston.

Plot
Eleanor the elephant is the only circus elephant to ever had performed her act while walking on a tall pair of stilts. After a terrible fall, she is forced into retirement. As she rides away from the circus in a seven-ton truck, she quakes from her trunk to her toes wondering where she is going. She ends up in a neat little red barn in the city zoo, under a shady sycamore tree. But Eleanor is not happy unless she can do something clever to earn her keep. One day she discovers she has a talent for drawing, and the amazed zoo director sets up a show for her so she can once again hear people calling out "Encore for Eleanor, once more Eleanor once more!".

References

External links
Encore for Eleanor at author's website

1981 children's books
American children's books
American picture books
Children's fiction books
English-language books
Books about elephants
United States in fiction
Circus books
Picture books by Bill Peet